{{Speciesbox | taxon = Hippeastrum evansiae | image =Hippeastrum evansiae.jpg| authority =(Traub & I.S.Nelson) H.E.Moore<ref name=KewWC>Royal Botanic Gardens, Kew: [http://apps.kew.org/wcsp/namedetail.do?name_id=278162Hippeastrum evansiae'].</ref> | synonyms =  Amaryllis evansiae Traub & I.S.Nelson
}}Hippeastrum evansiae is a flowering perennial herbaceous bulbous plant, in the family Amaryllidaceae, native to Bolivia.

 Description and habitat Hippeastrum evansiae is rare because their natural habitat is being used for agriculture. Hippeastrum evansiae grows in hot dry forests and prefers a warm and dry winter. It is one of the smallest species in the genus Hippeastrum''.

Taxonomy 
Described by Traub & I.S.Nelson in 1956, and the name formally accepted in 1963.

References

Sources 
 
 GBIF: Hippeastrum evansiae

Flora of South America
evansiae
Garden plants of South America